Tai Shui Hang is an area in Ma On Shan, Sha Tin District, New Territories, Hong Kong.

Tai Shui Hang Village is a historic village within the area.

See also
 Chevalier Garden
 Kam Tai Court
 Mountain Shore
 Tak Sun Secondary School
 Tai Shui Hang station
 Turret Hill aka. Nui Po Shan

Reference